The 1996 Dartmouth Big Green football team represented Dartmouth College in the 1996 NCAA Division I-AA football season.

Schedule

References

Dartmouth
Dartmouth Big Green football seasons
Ivy League football champion seasons
College football undefeated seasons
Dartmouth Big Green football